John McKeon may refer to:

John McKeon (1808–1883), American lawyer and New York United States Representative
John F. McKeon (born 1958), American politician, New Jersey state legislature, 27th district
John M. McKeon (1882–1939), American politician, Missouri senator
Jack McKeon (born 1930), Major League Baseball manager